Deekshitha Manikkam is an Indian actress who has appeared in Tamil language films. After making her debut in the Tamil film Kerala Nattilam Pengaludane (2014), she has been in films including Thirumanam Enum Nikkah (2014) and Aagam (2016).

Career
Born in Chennai, Deekshitha Manikkam completed a computer science engineering degree at SRM University before going on to participate as a finalist with Miss South India and also featured in the web series Happy To Be Single. She made her first on screen appearance by portraying one of the lead characters in the romantic comedy Kerala Nattilam Pengaludane (2014), before portraying a friend of Nazriya's character in Aascar Films' Thirumanam Enum Nikkah (2014). Deekshitha later appeared in the leading female role in Aagam and then in Nagarvalam.

In September 2017, she married music composer Dharan Kumar.

Filmography

References

Indian film actresses
Tamil actresses
Living people
Actresses in Tamil cinema
Actresses from Chennai
Year of birth missing (living people)